Kansas' 2nd congressional district is a congressional district in the U.S. state of Kansas that covers most of the eastern part of the state, except for the core of the Kansas City Metropolitan Area. The district encompasses less than a quarter of the state. The state capital of Topeka, the cities of Emporia, Junction City and Leavenworth and most of Kansas City are located within this district. The district is currently represented by Republican Jake LaTurner.

History
Kansas had but one representative in the U.S. House of Representatives until after the 1870 U.S. Census, which showed that the state was entitled to three members of the lower branch of the national legislature. In 1872, three representatives-at-large were elected, but by the act of March 2, 1874, the legislature divided the state into three districts. The 2nd congressional district was composed of the counties of Montgomery, Wilson, Labette, Cherokee, Crawford, Neosho, Bourbon, Allen, Anderson, Linn, Miami, Franklin, Johnson, Douglas and Wyandotte.

No changes were made in until after the 1880 U.S. Census, which gave the state seven representatives. On March 5, 1883, Governor George Washington Glick approved an act of the legislature which reduced the 2nd congressional district to only include the counties of Wyandotte, Johnson, Douglas, Miami, Franklin, Anderson, Linn, Allen and Bourbon.

Although the 1890 U.S. Census showed the population of Kansas to be large enough to entitle the state to eight representatives, no additional district was created until 1905. By the act of March 9, 1905, the state was divided into eight districts with the 2nd Congressional district being composed of the counties of Wyandotte, Johnson, Douglas, Miami, Franklin, Anderson, Linn, Allen and Bourbon.

Reapportionment for 2002 placed the western half of Lawrence as well as Miami County into the 2nd congressional district and cut out the counties of Geary, Montgomery and Nemaha.

Reapportionment in 2012 meant that the entirety of Lawrence was moved to the 2nd congressional district. The district's boundaries were altered to remove Manhattan, home of Kansas State University, and portions of Miami County while adding all of Montgomery County and Nemaha County and portions of Marshall County.

Reapportionment in 2022 moved the entirety of Lawrence to the 1st congressional district. The district's boundaries were also altered to move Anderson and Franklin counties and portions of Miami County to the 3rd congressional district. The entirety of Miami County is now in the 3rd congressional district. Most of Jackson, all of Jefferson and the remaining part of Marshall counties moved from the district to the 1st congressional district. The counties of Chase, Geary, Lyon, Marion, Morris and Wabaunsee all moved from the 1st congressional district to the district.

Demographics
Following redistricting after the 2000 U.S. Census, there were 672,102 people, 257,856 households, and 173,309 families residing in the district. There were 280,213 housing units at an average density of 19.8/mi2. The racial makeup of the district is 89.01% White, 5.06% Black or African American, 1.26% Native American, 0.97% Asian, 0.06% Pacific Islander, 1.52% from other races, and 2.12% from two or more races. Hispanic or Latino of any race were 3.81% of the population.

There were 257,856 households, out of which 34.60% had children under the age of 18 living with them, 54.48% were married couples living together, 9.20% had a female householder with no husband present, and 32.79% were non-families. 26.73% of all households were made up of individuals, and 10.63% had someone living alone who was 65 years of age or older. The average household size was 2.49 and the average family size was 3.02.

In the district the population distribution by age is 25.34% under the age of 18, 11.88% from 18 to 24, 27.54% from 25 to 44, 21.70% from 45 to 64, and 13.54% who were 65 years of age or older.  The median age was 35.3 years. For every 100 females, there were 99.08 males. For every 100 females age 18 and over, there were 96.85 males.

The median income for a household in the district is $37,855, and the median income for a family was $47,095. Males had a median income of $32,033 versus $24,230 for females. The per capita income for the district was $18,595. About 7.1% of families and 11.2% of the population were below the poverty line, including 12.0% of those under age 18 and 9.3% of those age 65 or over.

Among the population aged 16 years and older, 64.5% was in the civilian labor force and 1.9% were in the armed forces. Of the employed civilian workers, 20.6% were government workers and 7.5% were self-employed. Management, professional, and related occupations employed 32.3% of the work force and sales and office occupations employ 25.4%.  Only 0.8% were employed in farming, fishing, and forestry occupations. The largest employment by industry was: educational, health and social services, 24.5%; manufacturing, 12.3%; and retail trade, 11.4%. Agriculture, forestry, fishing and hunting, and mining industries only employed 3.0%.

List of members representing the district

Recent election results from statewide races

Recent election results

2002

2004

2006

2008

2010

2012

2014

2016

2018

2020

2022

Historical district boundaries

See also

Kansas's congressional districts
List of United States congressional districts
United States congressional delegations from Kansas

References

 Congressional Biographical Directory of the United States 1774–present

02
Allen County, Kansas
Atchison County, Kansas
Bourbon County, Kansas
Brown County, Kansas
Chase County, Kansas
Cherokee County, Kansas
Coffey County, Kansas
Crawford County, Kansas
Doniphan County, Kansas
Douglas County, Kansas
Geary County, Kansas
Jackson County, Kansas
Labette County, Kansas
Leavenworth County, Kansas
Linn County, Kansas
Lyon County, Kansas
Marion County, Kansas
Montgomery County, Kansas
Morris County, Kansas
Nemaha County, Kansas
Neosho County, Kansas
Osage County, Kansas
Shawnee County, Kansas
Wabaunsee County, Kansas
Wilson County, Kansas
Woodson County, Kansas
Wyandotte County, Kansas